The Sophy, also spelled Sofi, Sophie, Sophi, or Soffi, was a reference to the ruler of the Safavid dynasty of Iran. Even though Iran remained known in the West by the exonym Persia (see Name of Iran), which had been coined in "the days of the ancient Greeks", from the time of king Abbas I (r. 1588-1629), the ruler of the nation came to be known as the "Sophy", itself a corruption of the word "Safavi" - the dynasty to which Abbas I belonged.

Though the usage of "Sophy" gained much more prominence during Abbas I's rule, the word was in use to refer to the Safavid ruler since the time of the dynasty's founder, Ismail I (r. 1501-1524).

An extensive number of references to Persia and its "Sophy" in European literature start with the reign of Abbas I and onwards. William Shakespeare's Twelfth Night (published 1602) is noted as being amongst the early attestments to this.

References

Sources
 
 
 

Safavid Iran